Partial-wave analysis, in the context of quantum mechanics, refers to a technique for solving scattering problems by decomposing each wave into its constituent angular-momentum components and solving using boundary conditions.

Preliminary scattering theory 
The following description follows the canonical way of introducing elementary scattering theory. A steady beam of particles scatters off a spherically symmetric potential , which is short-ranged, so that for large distances , the particles behave like free particles. In principle, any particle should be described by a wave packet, but we instead describe the scattering of a plane wave  traveling along the z axis, since wave packets can be expanded in terms of plane waves, and this is mathematically simpler. Because the beam is switched on for times long compared to the time of interaction of the particles with the scattering potential, a steady state is assumed. This means that the stationary Schrödinger equation for the wave function  representing the particle beam should be solved:

 

We make the following ansatz:

 

It is the asymptotic form of  that is of interest, because observations near the scattering center (e.g. an atomic nucleus) are mostly not feasible, and detection of particles takes place far away from the origin. At large distances, the particles should behave like free particles, and  should therefore be a solution to the free Schrödinger equation. This suggests that it should have a similar form to a plane wave, omitting any physically meaningless parts. We therefore investigate the plane-wave expansion:

 

The spherical Bessel function  asymptotically behaves like

 

This corresponds to an outgoing and an incoming spherical wave. For the scattered wave function, only outgoing parts are expected. We therefore expect  at large distances and set the asymptotic form of the scattered wave to

 

where  is the so-called scattering amplitude, which is in this case only dependent on the elevation angle  and the energy.

In conclusion, this gives the following asymptotic expression for the entire wave function:

Partial-wave expansion 

In case of a spherically symmetric potential , the scattering wave function may be expanded in spherical harmonics, which reduce to Legendre polynomials because of azimuthal symmetry (no dependence on ):

 

In the standard scattering problem, the incoming beam is assumed to take the form of a plane wave of wave number , which can be decomposed into partial waves using the plane-wave expansion in terms of spherical Bessel functions and Legendre polynomials:

 

Here we have assumed a spherical coordinate system in which the  axis is aligned with the beam direction. The radial part of this wave function consists solely of the spherical Bessel function, which can be rewritten as a sum of two spherical Hankel functions:

 

The incoming wave is unaffected by the scattering, while the outgoing wave is modified by a factor known as the partial-wave S-matrix element :

 

where  is the radial component of the actual wave function. The scattering phase shift  is defined as half of the phase of :

 

If flux is not lost, then , and thus the phase shift is real. This is typically the case, unless the potential has an imaginary absorptive component, which is often used in phenomenological models to simulate loss due to other reaction channels.

Therefore, the full asymptotic wave function is

 

Subtracting  yields the asymptotic outgoing wave function:

 

Making use of the asymptotic behavior of the spherical Hankel functions, one obtains

 

Since the scattering amplitude  is defined from

 

it follows that

 

and thus the differential cross section is given by

 

This works for any short-ranged interaction. For long-ranged interactions (such as the Coulomb interaction), the summation over  may not converge. The general approach for such problems consist in treating the Coulomb interaction separately from the short-ranged interaction, as the Coulomb problem can be solved exactly in terms of Coulomb functions, which take on the role of the Hankel functions in this problem.

References

External links 
 Partial Wave Analysis for Dummies
 Partial Wave Analysis of Scattering

Quantum mechanics
Scattering theory